The Nash Block, also known as the McKesson-Robbins Warehouse and currently as The Greenhouse, is located at 902-912 Farnam Street in Omaha, Nebraska. Designed by Thomas R. Kimball and built in 1907, the building is the last remnant of Downtown Omaha's Jobbers Canyon. It was named an Omaha Landmark in 1978, and was listed on the National Register of Historic Places in 1985.

About
The Nash Block was composed of two identical warehouse buildings, built in 1905 for one of Omaha's wealthy elite, Catherine B. Nash. Thomas R. Kimball designed the building as the first factory-warehouse in Omaha with the modern fire protection elements, including brick enclosures for stairs and elevators, fireproof doors and an automatic sprinkler system. The two buildings' first occupants relied on the city's railroads, and the building's proximity to them.

The M. E. Smith Company was the largest and most important dry goods firm in Omaha at the turn of the century. The building was later occupied for many years by the McKesson-Robbins Drug Company, and is still often referred to by that name. The northernmost building was razed to construct the Gene Leahy Mall and in 1989 the remaining building was renovated into apartment units known as "The Greenhouse."

See also
History of Omaha

References

External links
 Nash Block - Historic photos of the Nash Block from the Library of Congress.

National Register of Historic Places in Omaha, Nebraska
Omaha Landmarks
Apartment buildings in Omaha, Nebraska
Commercial buildings completed in 1907
Thomas Rogers Kimball buildings
Commercial buildings on the National Register of Historic Places in Nebraska
1900s establishments in Nebraska